During the 2000–01 English football season, Swindon Town F.C. competed in the Football League Second Division.

Season summary
Swindon had a dismal start to the 2000–01 season and Todd quit in November to take the assistant manager's job at Premiership side Derby County. Todd's assistant, Andy King, stepped up to the manager's seat and remained there for the rest of the season. He achieved survival in Division Two but his short-term contract was not renewed at the end of the season.

Final league table

Results
Swindon Town's score comes first

Legend

Football League Second Division

FA Cup

League Cup

Football League Trophy

Squad

Left club during season

References

Swindon Town F.C. seasons
Swindon Town